Jasmine Naeem (born 10 March 1981) is an English cricket umpire. She stood in List A matches in 2022 Jersey Cricket World Cup Challenge League B, which was formed part of the inaugural 2019–2022 ICC Cricket World Cup Challenge League.

She has stood as an umpire in international matches featuring the England women's cricket team, during India's tour of England in 2022.

Family and personal life
Jasmine met her partner Naeem, during a summer cricket match in 2000. On 15 June 2000, Jasmine married Naeem in an Islamic ceremony among family and friends. Three months later, on 12 September, they were married again in a civil ceremony. The union produced three sons, Shazaib Naeem (born 14 September 2001), Umair Naeem (born 5 August 2003) and Zahir Naeem (born 14 November 2006).

Both husband and wife are cricket umpires, primarily in domestic matches in England. They became the first married couple to officiate a professional fixture in England together when they officiated in a domestic match in the 2022 Rachael Heyhoe Flint Trophy between Lightning and Western Storm on 2 July 2022.

References

External links
 
 

1981 births
Living people
English cricket umpires